Bagré  is a department or commune of Boulgou Province in eastern Burkina Faso. Its capital lies at the town of Bagré. According to the 2006 census, actualized for the municipal élections of 2013, the department has a total population of 29,164.

The region is well known for its rice farms and for the artificial lake close to the village of Bagré.

Towns and villages
 Bagré (or Bagré-Village) (4 993 inhabitants) (capital)
 Boakla (2 169 inhabitants) 
 Dirlakou (11 387 inhabitants) 
 Goudayere (672 inhabitants) 
 Guingale (1 166inhabitants) 
 Sangaboule (1 627 inhabitants) 
 Yambo (3 9 32 inhabitants) 
 Zabo (3 218 inhabitants)
(populations as of 2012)

References

Departments of Burkina Faso
Boulgou Province